Dhivya Polytechnic College (Tamil: திவ்யா பாலிடெக்னிக் கல்லூரி) was established in Chetpet, Thiruvannamalai, Tamil Nadu, India in 2008 by 'B.Selvarajan Educational Trust' under the leadership of managing trustee Thiru. 'B.Selvarajan'.

Affiliation 
The college got approval from Government of Tamil Nadu and All India Council for Technical Education, New Delhi and is affiliated to Directorate of Technical Education, Chennai.

Courses offered 
Dhivya Polytechnic College was established initially with five courses. Presently it offers six diploma courses.
 Automobile Engineering
 Civil Engineering
 Computer Engineering
 Electrical and Electronics Engineering
 Electronics and Communication Engineering
 Mechanical Engineering

Location 
Dhivya Polytechnic College is in Chetpet, Arcot to Villupuram State Highway (SH4). It is 148 km from Chennai, and the nearest railway station is Polur (26 km).

Facilities

Library 
A modernized library has been established on the campus containing more than 12,000 volumes of books with topics related to arts, science, engineering, technology and management, adding the latest books and editions on the above subjects. To facilitate the periodic update of student's knowledge, the college subscribes Indian and international journals and magazines.

Placements 
Over the years, many Indian companies have arrived at Dhivya Polytechnic College for campus placements.

 India Nippon Electricals Limited, Pondicherry
 Nipro Motors India Pvt Limited, Hosur
 TVS Brakes India Limited, Sholingur, Padi, Chengalpet
 Avalon Technology, Tambaram
 Roll Tech Engineering, Avadi
 TRR Automotive, Sriperumbudur
 Sona Group of Technology, Sriperumbudur
 Ashok Leyland, Hosur
 TVS, Hosur
 Hyundai, Chennai
 TAFE
 Reynolds
 Sundaram Clayton Limited
 Motherson
 Renault Nissan
 Rane
 Rajsriya Automotive Industries
 Caterpillar
 Raini Industries India PVT Ltd

Scholarship 
 No Parent Scholarship
 Sports Scholarship
 Village Scholarship
 Merit Scholarship
 STAR Scholarship

Group of institutions 
The management has an excellent track record for more than 30 years for serving education in very high standards.
 Dhivya Matriculation Higher Secondary School
 Dhivya Arts And Science College
 Dhivya High School
 Dhivya College of Education
 Dhivya Teacher Training Institute

External links 
 intradote.tn
 Dhivya Polytechnic College 
 Placements 
 Self Financing College in Tamil Nadu

References

Colleges in Tamil Nadu
Education in Tiruvannamalai district
Educational institutions established in 2008
2008 establishments in Tamil Nadu